Gulch Island may refer to:

 Gulch Island (Antarctica) 
 Gulch Island (Western Australia)